Gian Marco Nesta (born 1 March 2000) is an Italian footballer who plays as a right-back for  club Viterbese on loan from Lecco. He is the nephew of former Italian international Alessandro Nesta.

Club career
Born in Narni, Umbria, Nesta was on the books of Rome-based rivals Lazio and Roma as a youth before joining Ternana of Serie C in 2016. He made his senior debut on 29 July 2018 in the first round of the Coppa Italia, starting in a 1–1 home draw (penalty shootout victory) against Pontedera; he was substituted after 78 minutes for Andrea Repossi. On 24 August 2019, he made his league debut on the first day of the new season, a 3–1 win at Rieti.

On 8 September 2020, he joined fellow Serie C club Lecco on loan.

On 21 January 2022, he returned to Lecco on a permanent basis, signing a contract until June 2023 with an option to extend. On 25 August 2022, Nesta was loaned by Viterbese.

Club statistics

Club

Notes

References

2000 births
Living people
People from Narni
Sportspeople from the Province of Terni
Footballers from Umbria
Italian footballers
Association football defenders
Serie C players
S.S. Lazio players
A.S. Roma players
Ternana Calcio players
Calcio Lecco 1912 players
U.S. Viterbese 1908 players